Elena Tonnini (born 2 January 1979) is a politician from the RETE Movement of San Marino who has served as the Secretary of State for Internal Affairs, Civil Service, Institutional Affairs and Relations with the Municipalities since January 2020.

References

Living people
1979 births
Sammarinese women in politics